The 2018–19 Charlotte 49ers women's basketball team represents the University of North Carolina at Charlotte during the 2018–19 NCAA Division I women's basketball season. The 49ers, led by seventh year head coach Cara Consuegra, play their home games at Dale F. Halton Arena and were members of Conference USA. They finished the season 18–14, 9–7 in C-USA play to finish in a tie for seventh place. They advanced to the quarterfinals of the C-USA women's tournament where they lost to UAB. They received an at-large bid to the Women's National Invitation Tournament where they lost to VCU in the first round.

Roster

Schedule

|-
!colspan=9 style=| Exhibition

|-
!colspan=9 style=| Non-conference regular season

|-
!colspan=9 style=| Conference USA regular season

|-
!colspan=9 style=| Conference USA Women's Tournament

|-
!colspan=9 style=| WNIT

Rankings
2018–19 NCAA Division I women's basketball rankings

See also
 2018–19 Charlotte 49ers men's basketball team

References

Charlotte 49ers women's basketball seasons
Charlotte
Charlotte